Henry Nicoll (17 April 1908 – 4 December 1999) was a British equestrian and Olympic medalist. He was born in Kensington. He won a bronze medal in show jumping at the 1948 Summer Olympics in London. Nicoll retired to the Mashonaland region of northeastern Zimbabwe in December 1981 and lived there until his death in 1999.

See also
Equestrian at the 1948 Summer Olympics

References

1908 births
1999 deaths
Sportspeople from Kensington
British male equestrians
British emigrants to Zimbabwe
Olympic equestrians of Great Britain
Olympic bronze medallists for Great Britain
Equestrians at the 1948 Summer Olympics
Olympic medalists in equestrian
Medalists at the 1948 Summer Olympics